Gymnelia ethodaea is a moth of the subfamily Arctiinae. It was described by Herbert Druce in 1889. It is found in Mexico.

References

 

Gymnelia
Moths described in 1889